Bouteflika is a surname. Notable people with the surname include:

Abdelaziz Bouteflika (1937–2021), Algerian politician
Saïd Bouteflika (born 1958), Algerian politician and academic, Abdelaziz's brother